Commophila nevadensis is a species of moth of the family Tortricidae. It is found in Spain.

The wingspan is about 21 mm. Adults are on wing from July to August.

References

Moths described in 1990
Cochylini